A London Cabinet can refer to a number of government cabinets:

 Nygaardsvold's Cabinet, the Norwegian government-in-exile between 7 June 1940 and 31 May 1945
 One of the four Dutch governments-in-exile between 13 May 1940 and May 1945:
 Second De Geer Cabinet
 First Gerbrandy Cabinet
 Second Gerbrandy Cabinet
 Third Gerbrandy Cabinet